Denmark was represented at the Eurovision Song Contest 1993 by the Tommy Seebach Band and "Under stjernerne på himlen", the winners of the Danish national final, Dansk Melodi Grand Prix 1993. The song was composed by Tommy Seebach and national final host Keld Heick.

Before Eurovision

Dansk Melodi Grand Prix 1993 
Danmarks Radio (DR) continued to use the Dansk Melodi Grand Prix contest to select the Danish entry for Eurovision.

The final was held on 3 April 1993 in Odense, hosted by Keld Heick and Kirsten Siggaard. Ten songs competed in the contest and the winner was selected over two rounds of voting. In the first round, a nine-member jury selected the top five songs to advance to the second round of voting, where the winner was selected solely by a public televote. The results of the public televote were revealed by Denmark's regions and led to the victory of Tommy Seebach Band with the song "Under stjernerne på himlen". This was Seebach's seventh appearance at Dansk Melodi Grand Prix, having previously won twice (in 1979 and 1981 (with Debbie Cameron) as well as placing 2nd in 1982, 4th in 1984, 2nd in 1985 and 4th in 1987. The show was watched by 1.9 million viewers in Denmark, making it the most popular show of the week.

At Eurovision 
Seebach performed 5th at the Eurovision Song Contest 1993 in Millstreet, Ireland, following Switzerland and preceding Greece. "Under stjernerne på himlen" placed 22nd of the 25 competing countries, receiving a total of 9 points. This relegated Denmark from competing in the Eurovision Song Contest 1994, after placing in the bottom 6 entries. The contest was watched by a total of 1.5 million viewers in Denmark.

Voting

References

External links 
Danish National Final 1993

1993
Countries in the Eurovision Song Contest 1993
Eurovision